James Aloysius Robert Quinn (February 14, 1870 – March 12, 1954), often referred to as J. A. Robert Quinn, was an American executive in Major League Baseball who became renowned for his management of four different franchises.

Career
Born in Columbus, Ohio, Quinn was a catcher in minor league baseball during the 1890s, also managing some of the teams for which he played. From 1902 to 1917, he served as general manager of the Columbus Senators in the American Association; he was also among the founders of that league. In 1908, he founded and was president of the Ohio State League, a Class D minor league which began operation as a six team league with teams located in Central/Southern Ohio. He became general manager of the St. Louis Browns from 1917 to 1922, developing the perennially poor team into one which lost the 1922 American League pennant by a single game.

In the summer of 1923, fresh off that success, Quinn put together a syndicate that purchased the Boston Red Sox from Harry Frazee. The purchase was financed by four investors who knew him from his days in Columbus, with the largest contribution coming from glass magnate Palmer Winslow. The investors trusted Quinn enough to make him president and operating head of the franchise. Quinn had every intention of rebuilding a team that had been rendered bereft of talent after Frazee's chronic cash shorts forced him to sell nearly every talented player to the New York Yankees. To that end, he spent $250,000 on minor league stars  However, in a case of exceptionally bad timing, Winslow fell ill in 1924 and largely withdrew from financing the team. He died in 1926, and the three surviving members of Quinn's syndicate didn't have nearly enough money between them to make up for the loss of Winslow's investment. 

For the remainder of Quinn's tenure as owner of the Red Sox, the team was severely underfinanced. The team lost over $200,000 from 1924 to 1929. This led to a vicious circle in which lack of talent on the field sent attendance through the floor, thus denying Quinn money that could have been used to acquire more players or retain the few good players he had. As a result, Quinn's tenure as owner was, statistically speaking, the darkest in franchise history. With rosters made up mostly of castoffs from other AL teams, they finished finished dead last in the American League eight times during Quinn's ten years as owner, only rising as high as sixth twice.  They finally bottomed out in 1932, with a  record that is still the worst in franchise history.  

By the 1932–33 offseason, Quinn knew he was at the end of his tether. He needed to borrow against his life insurance just to send the team to spring training. Realizing that there was no way he could operate the Red Sox in 1933, he began searching for a buyer. He found his white knight in lumber magnate Tom Yawkey, who had been looking to buy a baseball team as soon as he turned 30 and gained full access to money in a trust fund set up for him by his uncle and adoptive father, former Detroit Tigers owner Bill Yawkey. Former baseball great Eddie Collins, who had attended the same high school as Yawkey, set up a meeting between Yawkey and Collins during the 1932 World Series. The $1.5 million deal closed just before the start of 1933 spring training, and just days after Yawkey turned 30.

Quinn then became general manager of the Brooklyn Dodgers for two seasons (1934–1935) before joining the Boston Braves as team president and part owner from 1936 to 1945. After his 1945 retirement, he briefly served as a sporting goods executive, and then became president of the Baseball Hall of Fame from 1948 to 1951, leaving that position after suffering two strokes.

Patriarch of baseball family
Quinn died at age 84 in Providence, Rhode Island, and was buried near Columbus. His son John J. Quinn took over as the general manager of the Braves following his father's retirement, continuing after the team moved to Milwaukee in 1953, and later served as GM of the Philadelphia Phillies. His grandson Bob Quinn was the general manager of the New York Yankees, Cincinnati Reds, and San Francisco Giants between 1988 and 1996, and his grandson Jack Quinn served as general manager of the St. Louis Blues franchise in the National Hockey League. His great-grandson Bob Quinn (born 1968) is the former executive vice president, finance and administration, and chief financial officer of the Milwaukee Brewers.

See also
 Honor Rolls of Baseball

References

Further reading
Bob Quinn at SABR (Baseball BioProject)

Major League Baseball executives
Boston Braves executives
Boston Braves owners
Boston Red Sox owners
Brooklyn Dodgers executives
Major League Baseball general managers
Major League Baseball team presidents
Major League Baseball owners
1954 deaths
1870 births